Egidius Juška (born 12 March 1975) is a Lithuanian former professional footballer, who last played in the A Lyga the highest level of Lithuanian for Žalgiris Vilnius.

Career
Juška won two Kazakhstan Super League titles while playing for Irtysh Pavlodar and one Estonian Mesitriliiga title during his second spell at TVMK Tallinn. He plays the position of midfielder and is 1.81 m tall and weighs 78 kg.

International career
Juška is the former member of the Lithuania national football team.

External links

1975 births
Living people
Footballers from Vilnius
Lithuanian footballers
Association football forwards
Lithuania international footballers
Lithuanian expatriate footballers
Expatriate footballers in Estonia
Expatriate footballers in Belarus
Expatriate footballers in Kazakhstan
Expatriate footballers in Azerbaijan
Lithuanian expatriate sportspeople in Kazakhstan
Lithuanian expatriate sportspeople in Estonia
A Lyga players
Belarusian Premier League players
Kazakhstan Premier League players
Azerbaijan Premier League players
FK Kareda Kaunas players
FK Panerys Vilnius players
FK Atlantas players
FK Žalgiris players
FC TVMK players
FC Torpedo Minsk players
FC Irtysh Pavlodar players
Qarabağ FK players